The Military ranks of Biafra were the military insignia used by the Biafran Armed Forces between 1967 and 1970, when Biafra was defeated in the Nigerian Civil War.

Commissioned officer ranks

The rank insignia of commissioned officers.

Other ranks

The rank insignia of non-commissioned officers and enlisted personnel.

References

External links

 

Biafra
Biafra
Military history of Nigeria